William Paul Petersen (born September 23, 1945) is an American actor, singer, novelist, and activist.

Petersen first rose to prominence in the 1950s playing Jeff Stone on The Donna Reed Show, and transitioned to a singing career in the 1960s. In the early 1980s, he had a recurring role as a police officer on Matt Houston, and in the late 1990s, he played the author Paul Conway in the film Mommy's Day.

In 1990, Petersen established the organization A Minor Consideration to support child stars and other child laborers through legislation, family education, and personal intervention and counseling for those in crisis.

Career

Acting
 
Petersen began his show-business career at the age of 10 as a Mouseketeer on the Mickey Mouse Club. He appeared in the 1958 movie Houseboat with Sophia Loren and Cary Grant, but achieved stardom playing teenager Jeff Stone from 1958 to 1966 on the ABC family television sitcom The Donna Reed Show.  Throughout eight seasons and decades of reruns in syndication, The Donna Reed Show became part of American popular culture, and in 1997, Petersen was honored by the Young Artist Foundation with its Former Child Star "Lifetime Achievement" Award for his role on the series.

After The Donna Reed Show ended, Petersen had a small role as Tony Biddle in the 1967 musical film The Happiest Millionaire. He also appeared in many guest roles, including one as a military officer in the short-lived 1967 ABC Western series Custer, with Wayne Maunder in the title role. He also made a guest appearance on F Troop as "Johnny Eagle Eye" that aired on April 12, 1966.

Singing
With the fame he achieved on The Donna Reed Show, Petersen received recording offers and had hit record singles with the songs "She Can't Find Her Keys" (also introduced on The Donna Reed Show), "Amy", and "Lollipops and Roses". In 1962, the sentimental teen pop song "My Dad" was performed on The Donna Reed Show with Petersen singing the tune to his on-screen father, actor Carl Betz. Released as a single in the same year, it reached number six on the Billboard Hot 100 chart. He also recorded for Motown/Tamla throughout the 1960s releasing such singles as "Chained" and "A Little Bit For Sandy".

Writing
After his years as a child actor, Petersen attended university and obtained a degree in literature. He went on to write 16 adventure novels. Petersen's authorship began after he met David Oliphant, a New York City publisher visiting Los Angeles. His first novel concerned car racing. Thereafter, he created a Matt Helm-type hero, Eric Saveman, also known as "The Smuggler". In one year, Pocket Books published eight of his Smuggler novels, earning  $75,000 for Peterson. In 1977, Petersen's autobiography entitled Walt, Mickey and Me: Confessions of the First Ex-Mouseketeer was published.

Other ventures

He is a board member of the Donna Reed Foundation and works for the Donna Reed Festival, which takes place annually on the third week of June in Reed's hometown of Denison, Iowa. He also recently served on the board of directors of Screen Actors Guild-American Federation of Television and Radio Artists (SAG-AFTRA), a national media performers AFL-CIO union based in Los Angeles.

Activism
In 1990, following the suicide of former child star Rusty Hamer, Petersen founded a child-actor support group, A Minor Consideration, to improve working conditions for child actors and to assist in the transition between working as a child actor and adult life, whether in acting or in other professions.

Personal life
 
Petersen has been married three times. His first marriage was to actress Brenda Benet. They married in 1967 and divorced in 1970. In 1974, he married Hallie Litman with whom he had two children. They divorced in 1988. In December 1992, Petersen married Rana Jo Platz. In addition to his two children from his second marriage, Petersen also has a daughter from a previous relationship.

Discography

Studio albums
1962: Lollipops and Roses — Colpix CP-429/SCP-429
1963: Teenage Triangle — Colpix CP-444/SCP-444—No. 48, May 1963
Featuring four tracks each by Paul Petersen, Shelley Fabares, and James Darren
1963: My Dad — Colpix CP-442/SCP-442 
1963: Bye Bye Birdie — Colpix CP-454/SCP-454
Songs from the movie sung by Petersen, The Marcels, James Darren, and Shelley Fabares
1964: More Teenage Triangle — Colpix CP-468/SCP-468
Second album featuring Petersen, Fabares, and Darren

Singles

Filmography

References

External links

 
 A Minor Consideration
 
 Paul Petersen at AllMusic 

1945 births
20th-century American male actors
20th-century American novelists
21st-century American male actors
Living people
Male actors from Glendale, California
American male television actors
American male child actors
American child singers
American trade union leaders
20th-century American memoirists
American male novelists
American male pop singers
Colpix Records artists
Motown artists
Mouseketeers
People from Greater Los Angeles
Writers from California
American male non-fiction writers
Latter Day Saints from California
20th-century American male writers